Barry Hawkins (born 23 April 1979) is an English professional snooker player from Ditton, Kent. He turned professional in 1996, but only rose to prominence in the 2004–05 snooker season, when he reached the last 16 of the 2004 UK Championship, the quarter-finals of the 2004 British Open and the semi-finals of the 2005 Welsh Open. He has now spent twelve successive seasons ranked inside the top 32. Hawkins reached his first ranking final and won his first ranking title at the 2012 Australian Goldfields Open.

Hawkins has played in the televised stages of every World Championship since he made his Crucible Theatre debut in 2006. He lost in the first round on his first five appearances, but reached the second round in 2011 and 2012. Rated an 80–1 outsider for the 2013 World Snooker Championship before the tournament began, he defeated opponents including world number1 Mark Selby and top Chinese player Ding Junhui to reach the final, which he lost to defending champion Ronnie O'Sullivan. Hawkins has since reached the semi-finals of the World Championship in 2014, 2015, 2017 and 2018, and he was runner-up in the Masters in 2016 and 2022.

Career

Early career

Before taking up snooker professionally, Hawkins was an office clerk. He reached the Top 32 in the rankings in 2004/2005, having reached the semi-finals of 2005's Welsh Open, as well as the last sixteen of three other tournaments.

2005/2006
In 2005/2006, he reached the semi-finals of the Grand Prix and the Welsh Open again, and also beat the high-ranked Ding Junhui to qualify for the World Championship for the first time. This cemented Hawkins' place in the Top 16 of the rankings for the 2006/2007 season.

At the World Championship in Sheffield, however, Hawkins faced former Champion Ken Doherty in the first round, and in the intimidating Crucible Theatre lost 10–1. He told the BBC that "I just couldn't perform and I don't know why... I'm gutted after such a good season to have performed like that."

2006–2009
The 2006/2007 season saw Hawkins disappointed following two strong seasons. He reached the final of the non-ranking Kilkenny Irish Masters, however his only run past the last 16 in a ranking event was at the China Open, when he reached the semi-finals, again beating Ding along the way. He had one foot in his first final against Jamie Cope in the semi final, but Cope was able to obtain the snookers he needed to stay in the match and went on to win 6–5.
A first-round defeat by Fergal O'Brien at the World Championship cost him his Top 16 place, and left him outside the Top 32 on the single-year rankings.

Early in the 2007/2008 season, Hawkins won the qualifying tournament for the 2008 SAGA Insurance Masters, beating Kurt Maflin. He won five other matches, also beating top-32 players Nigel Bond and Jamie Cope. He also reached the last 16 at the Grand Prix, UK Championship and China Open.

He started the 2008–09 season with a quarter-final appearance at the 2008 Northern Ireland Trophy, by beating Jimmy White 5–3, Marco Fu 5–2 and Ryan Day 5–3 where he played Ronnie O'Sullivan, losing 5–4 after producing a brave fightback from 4–1 to level at 4–4. He then won at least his opening match in the next four ranking events, reaching the provisional top 16. He did not qualify for the events in Wales and China, but made it to the World Championship by beating Daniel Wells 10–9, but lost in the first round, finishing one place short of a return to the top 16.

From 2006 to 2010, Hawkins's record at the World Championship was unsuccessful, with a win–loss record of 0–5. As well as the aforementioned one-sided defeat by Doherty, Hawkins narrowly lost in the first round the following two years as well, to Fergal O'Brien and Ali Carter respectively. Coincidentally, on both occasions Hawkins lost by very close 10–9 defeats, having recovered from 9–6 behind each time. In 2009 Hawkins missed out on a chance to take his match with former champion Graeme Dott to a deciding frame, and lost 10–8. The following year, Hawkins led defending champion John Higgins 5–3 before Higgins won seven of the next eight frames to progress.

2010/2011
Hawkins played well at the World Open (formerly the Grand Prix) in defeating Mark Selby (3–2) as well as former World Champion Ken Doherty (3–1) before losing 4–2 to Mark Williams.

Hawkins qualified for the World Championship for the sixth year running, where he was drawn against Stephen Maguire in the first round. Having never won a match at the Crucible before, Hawkins led Maguire 4–0, 5–1, 6–2 and 8–4 before seeing Maguire level the match at 8–8 and then 9–9. However, Hawkins held his nerve in the deciding frame to finally end his losing run at the World Championship. In the second round, Hawkins was defeated 13–12 by world No. 11 Mark Allen.

2011/2012
Hawkins reached the PTC Finals in the 2011–12 season largely thanks to semi-final runs in Event 3 and Event 5. He finished 22nd on the Order of Merit, inside the top 24 who qualified. In the Finals he lost in the first round 3–4 to Jack Lisowski. Hawkins won the non-ranking Snooker Shoot-Out, a tournament where the winner of each round is determined by a single 10-minute frame. He beat Graeme Dott in the final and picked up a cheque for £32,000, the biggest of his career to date.

Hawkins' best run in the ranking events came in the final and biggest tournament of the season, the World Championship. He qualified by beating David Morris and was drawn to play world number one Mark Selby, who had come into the event having suffered a neck injury and declaring himself fit to play only one week before. Hawkins comfortably won 10–3 to face Matthew Stevens in the second round. He led 8–6 after two sessions in a bid to reach his first quarter-final at the Crucible, but had no answer to Stevens in the latter stages as he won seven of the last 10 frames to take the match 13–11. Hawkins finished the season ranked world number 22.

2012/2013
Hawkins began the 2012–13 season at the Wuxi Classic, where he faced Mark Selby in the first round once more, this time losing 2–5.

First ranking title
His next ranking event was the Australian Goldfields Open in Bendigo, where he defeated Xiao Guodong (5–1), Matthew Stevens (5–2), Matthew Selt (5–3), and Mark Davis (6–4) to reach the first ranking event final of his 16-year professional career. He faced Peter Ebdon and finished the first session of the match leading 5–3, which included a spell of four successive frames that meant Ebdon had not potted a ball for over an hour. In the evening session Hawkins won all four frames played to take the title with a 9–3 victory. He made three centuries in the final and climbed to world number 20 thanks to the win, as well as earning praise from Ebdon himself.

Other tournaments
Despite then losing in the first round of the Shanghai Masters and in qualifying for the International Championship, Hawkins climbed into the top 16 in November meaning he would be in the main draw in the Masters for the first time since 2007. Neil Robertson beat him 6–2 in the UK Championship and in the Masters he was 5–4 up against Judd Trump but missed two pots when well placed to win the match and instead went to lose 5–6, a result which left Hawkins "devastated". He bounced back at the next ranking event, the German Masters, by seeing off Dechawat Poomjaeng 5–2, Mark Allen 5–1 and Mark Selby 5–1 to reach the semi-finals. He lost 4–6 to Marco Fu in a long match which finished after midnight local time and included a bout of safety which lasted almost an hour. Hawkins failed to get past the second round in the World Open, China Open or Welsh Open. He played in eight of the minor-ranking Players Tour Championship events with his best result being a semi-final defeat by Joe Swail in the first European Tour Event. Two further quarter-final defeats saw him finish 15th on the Order of Merit to qualify for the Finals, where he lost 1–4 to Robertson in the second round.

World Championship final
At the World Championship, he put Jack Lisowski under sustained pressure with his superior safety game in a 10–3 win to face Mark Selby in the second round. Hawkins was 7–9 behind to the world number one after the second session but came back to triumph 13–10 in a win he described as the best of his career. In his first World Championship quarter-final he defeated Ding Junhui 13–7 to progress to the semi-finals, where he played Ricky Walden. Hawkins struggled for form during the first two sessions, playing some gritty snooker to trail only 6–8 with a high break of just 36 and received ironic cheers and a punch of the air from Hawkins when he made 47 in the next frame. He went on to fall 8–12 behind but then began to find his game, as Walden's deteriorated, to win eight successive frames with two centuries in the process. Despite a brief fightback from Walden, Hawkins won the match 17–14 to set up a clash in the final with defending champion Ronnie O'Sullivan, Hawkins saying he had nothing to lose now. Hawkins fought gallantly throughout the final making breaks of 127 and 133, his highest ever at the Crucible, but every time he applied pressure to his opponent, O'Sullivan responded with clinical scoring which included six century breaks and a further 10 breaks of 50 throughout the match as he defeated Hawkins 18–12. For reaching the final he received prize money of £125,000, three times more than his previous biggest pay-day. Hawkins' turnaround from being a solid player to a ranking event winner and World Championship runner-up has been credited, in part, to his work with 1979 champion Terry Griffiths who has helped to give him the self-belief to make the most of his game. His successful season saw him climb 13 spots in the rankings to a career high world number nine, the first time he has finished a season inside the top 16 since 2006.

2013/2014
After a pair of second round exits in the opening two rankings events of the 2013–14 season, Hawkins levelled his quarter-final match against Mark Selby at the Shanghai Masters with a 140 break and then won the deciding frame to progress. In the semi-finals he was unable to match Ding Junhui's form as he was beaten 6–2. In a deciding frame against Shaun Murphy, Hawkins potted seven reds and seven blacks but had to make do with a break of 70 to take the match and reach the quarter-finals of the UK Championship for the first in his career. Hawkins led Selby 5–3, but went on to be beaten 6–5. In the semi-finals of the Welsh Open he lost 6–2 against Ronnie O'Sullivan.

Second ranking title
Hawkins played in all eight European Tour events during the season with his best result being a semi-final defeat at the Bulgarian Open, which helped him finish 25th on the Order of Merit and claim the final spot for the Finals. There he whitewashed Stephen Maguire 4–0 in the first round and then saw off Ryan Day 4–3 in an extremely tight match. Comfortable 4–1 victories over Yu Delu and Judd Trump followed as he reached the final. He faced an unlikely opponent in world number 66 and practice partner Gerard Greene. Hawkins did not give Greene a chance as he won the first two frames without him registering a point and completed a 4–0 win to take the £100,000 first prize.

At the World Championship, Hawkins played Ricky Walden in the second round, a repeat of last year's semi-final. The match was similar to the one 12 months earlier too, as Hawkins fought back from a 9–5 deficit to win 13–11. He built an 11–5 lead over Dominic Dale after two sessions of their quarter-final, but upon the resumption of play Dale incredibly won seven frames in a row to stand just one away from equalling the biggest comeback in a quarter-final at the Crucible. However, Hawkins regrouped and made breaks of 66 and 65 to win the last two frames and move into the semi-finals, where he faced Ronnie O'Sullivan in a rematch of the previous year's final. Hawkins trailed 2–6 after the first session and 5–11 after the second session, and lost the match 7–17 with a session to spare. Hawkins was the world number five at the end of the campaign, the highest he has ever finished a season.

2014/2015
Hawkins first ranking event of the 2014–15 season was the 2014 Wuxi Classic and he beat Marco Fu 5–4 to reach the semi-finals, stating later that he was gaining more self belief due to being in the latter stages of big events more regularly. From 3–3, Neil Robertson took a trio of frames to defeat Hawkins 6–3.
He was unable to build on his good start to the season however, as he could not advance beyond the last 32 of the next three ranking events and in the second round of the UK Championship he lost 6–5 to Nigel Bond after Hawkins had been 5–0 up.

In January 2015, he achieved the second maximum break of his career in his league stage match against Stephen Maguire in group1 of the Championship League. His form in ranking events did not improve though as he was knocked out in the first round of the German Masters and PTC Grand Final and the second round of the Welsh Open. An improvement came at the China Open with wins over Gerard Greene, Dominic Dale and Stephen Maguire. In the quarter-finals he was ousted 5–3 by world number 56 Gary Wilson.

Hawkins looked to be cruising into the second round of the World Championship after he took the opening session of his match with Matthew Selt 7–2 and extended it to 9–4. However, Selt won five frames on the trot to take the match into a deciding frame which Hawkins won. Hawkins produced a great comeback in the next round against Mark Allen by winning five frames in a row to triumph 13–11 and stated that the unique atmosphere of the Crucible Theatre helps him focus harder and is the reason for his recent good form in the event. In the quarter-finals, Hawkins won six frames from 3–1 behind, restricting his opponent Neil Robertson to just eight points in the process. The tie would eventually go into a deciding frame which Hawkins won with a 61 break to reach the semi-finals for the third year in a row. It was an extremely high quality encounter, during which both players made four centuries each to equal a World Championship record for a best of 25 frame match. Hawkins endured a tough semi-final as he fell 14–3 behind Shaun Murphy and only just avoided losing with a session to spare, as he returned to be defeated 17–9.

2015/2016
Hawkins took two months off at the beginning of the season and said he would be more selective with the events he enters in order to remain fresh for the entire year. He returned for the minor-ranking Riga Open and won it by defeating Tom Ford 4–1 in the final. Hawkins conceded only a total of seven frames in his seven matches during the event. A series of early ranking event exits followed, but Hawkins recaptured his form at the Masters. In an event where he had never won a match in five prior appearances, Hawkins eliminated Joe Perry 6–3, Mark Allen 6–2 and Judd Trump 6–4 to set up a meeting with Ronnie O'Sullivan in the final. Hawkins took the opening frame, but would lose 10–1 to equal the record of the biggest margin of defeat in a Masters final set by Steve Davis' 9–0 whitewash over Mike Hallett in 1988. In the PTC Finals, Hawkins eliminated Michael Holt 4–2, Robert Milkins 4–3 and Ding Junhui 4–2. He lost 6–3 to Ricky Walden in the semi-finals.

Hawkins met O'Sullivan in the second round of the World Championship, a player who he had not beat in 10 matches stretching back 14 years since their very first meeting. Hawkins led 9–7 after the second session and 12–9 to stand one frame away of the win. However, O'Sullivan quickly levelled the match at 12–12, but went in off during the deciding frame to allow Hawkins to be the only player to have reached the quarter-finals of the event for the past three years. Hawkins said the change from his heavy defeat to O'Sullivan at the Masters in January to beating him was playing the balls instead of his opponent and that he was proud of having handled the most pressure he ever felt during his career. The match seemed to take a lot out of Hawkins as he was 9–1 behind Marco Fu in the quarters, but he rediscovered his form to be just 10–9 and 12–11 down. In the next frame Hawkins was 60–0 ahead, before Fu made a 74 break to close out the match. Afterwards Hawkins said he had not slept at all after his win over O'Sullivan and was unable to focus during the first session of the Fu match.

2016/2017
After not getting past the third round in the early part of the 2016–17 season, Hawkins reached the semi-finals of the English Open, where he lost 6–2 to Judd Trump. The next Home Nations event was the Northern Ireland Open and Hawkins again won through to the semi-finals. Anthony Hamilton came back from 4–2 and 5–3 down to send the match in to a deciding frame in which he feathered the white when well placed to hand Hawkins a chance for the match which he took. Hawkins was 5–1 ahead of Mark King in the final, before King won five frames in a row. Hawkins won a re-spotted black to make it 8–8 and then lost the deciding frame. In the second round of the UK Championship, Fergal O'Brien became the first player to make five centuries in a best-of-11 frame match as he edged out Hawkins 6–5. Hawkins had a good run at the Masters, needing only one frame to reach the final for a second consecutive time. He had a 5–2 advantage in his semi-final match against Joe Perry, before Perry secured the snooker he needed to reduce the lead to 5–3. Perry went on to win the three remaining frames, clinching the match and narrowly denying Hawkins a rematch against defending champion Ronnie O'Sullivan.

Hawkins beat Kyren Wilson 4–2, Judd Trump 4–1, Neil Robertson 4–2 and Liang Wenbo 6–1 to reach the final of the
World Grand Prix. He made five century breaks to be 9–3 up on Ryan Day who then closed the gap to 9–7, before Hawkins took the next frame to win his third ranking title.

He lost 5–4 on the final black to Trump in the quarter-finals of the Welsh Open. Victories over Tom Ford, Graeme Dott and Stephen Maguire saw Hawkins play in his fourth World Championship semi-final in five years, but he didn't capitalise on the chances that came his way against John Higgins and was eliminated 17–8.

2017/2018 
In December 2017, Hawkins advanced to the third round of the UK Championship after beating Kurt Dunham and Hammad Miah, but was knocked out by Akani Songsermsawad after suffering a 6–0 defeat. After match, Hawkins said that he was "in a state of shock" for his performance. In January 2018, Hawkins was defeated by the eventual finalist Kyren Wilson in the first round of the Masters, he lost 6–4. In March, Hawkins reached the final of the Welsh Open after beating the likes of Tom Ford, Martin Gould, Yan Bingtao, and Noppon Saengkham. He faced John Higgins in the final. Despite making three centuries, he eventually lost 9–7. In April, Hawkins reached another final in a ranking event, this time he faced Mark Selby in the final of the China Open. But Selby, the defending champion, was proven to be too strong for Hawkins on the day, Hawkins lost by 11–3. In May, Hawkins maintained his excellent record at the Crucible, after beating Stuart Carrington, Lyu Haotian, and Ding Junhui, he reached another semi-final at the World Snooker Championship and faced Mark Williams. The match was a nervy classic, with a total of 20 breaks over 50 between the two players, Williams eventually won 17–15.

2018/2019 
In September 2018, Hawkins reached the final of the Shanghai Masters, an invitational tournament, after winning against Stephen Maguire, Mark Williams, and Ding Junhui, and set up a final with the defending champion Ronnie O'Sullivan. After leading 6–4 at the end of the morning session, Hawkins eventually lost 11–9. In December, Hawkins was knocked out of the UK Championship in the round of last 16 after losing 6–2 to Kyren Wilson. At the Masters, Hawkins advanced to the quarter final after beating Shaun Murphy 6–2 in the first round, but he was defeated by Neil Robertson in the next round, losing 6–3. In May 2019, Hawkins reached the second round of the World Snooker Championship after thrashing Li Hang 10–1 in the first round, he faced Kyren Wilson next. It was a high quality match, two players produced a total of 9 centuries during the match, but after leading 4–0, 6–2, and 9–5, Hawkins eventually lost 13–11.

2019/2020 
in August 2019, Hawkins won the invitational tournament Paul Hunter Classic after defeating the likes of Gary Wilson, Mark King, Joe Perry, and Kyren Wilson. In November 2019, Hawkins made his third maximum break in his 6-2 first round victory against Gerard Greene at the UK Championship. But he suffered a shocking 6–4 defeat in the next round against Alan McManus, despite leading 4–1 at one point. In January 2020, Hawkins had an early exit at the Masters, losing 6–1 to John Higgins in the first round. In August 2020, Hawkins faced Alexander Ursenbacher in the first round of the World Snooker Championship, in which he comfortably won by 10–2. He lost 13–9 to Neil Robertson in the next round.

2020/2021 
At the UK Championship, Hawkins advanced to the last 16 after beating the likes of Riley Parsons, Robbie Williams and Robert Milkins, but was knocked out of the tournament after losing 6–3 to Mark Selby. In January 2021, Hawkins did not participate in the Masters, but he did reach the semi final of the German Masters at the end of the month, his first appearance in the last four of a ranking event since 2019, and faced Judd Trump. Despite leading 5–1, Hawkins lost five straight frames and lost 6–5 at the end. In February, he reached another semi final, this time at the Players Championship, but he lost 6–4 to Ronnie O'Sullivan after taking a 3–0 lead. Hawkins qualified for the 2021 Tour Championship and beat Judd Trump 10–7 after leading 7–3 to reach the semi-finals. There, he was 9–6 ahead against O'Sullivan, but would ultimately lose 9–10.
 He lost 10–13 in the second round of the World Championship to Kyren Wilson, after winning five consecutive frames to level at 9–9.

2021/2022 
Hawkins reached the semi-finals of the UK Championship for the first time, losing 1–6 to eventual winner Zhao Xintong. At the second Triple Crown event of the season, the Masters, he defeated reigning world champion Mark Selby and come back from 4–5 down against Judd Trump to win 6–5, reaching the final of the event for the second time. He lost to Neil Robertson 4–10. Hawkins also reached the final of the Players Championship where he was the lowest seed, but lost to Robertson again by a 5–10 scoreline. He failed to progress past the first round of the World Championship for the first time since 2010, losing 7–10 to Crucible debutant Jackson Page.

Technique
Hawkins is naturally right-handed but plays left-handed. However, if he has to use the rest, he switches the cue to his dominant hand (right hand) for better handling. Additionally, this switch allows him to aim better because his right eye is his objective eye.

Personal life
Hawkins has been with his partner Tara since 2001; in January 2009 they had their first child, a son named Harrison. The couple were married in June 2012.

Performance and rankings timeline

Career finals

Ranking finals: 9 (3 titles)

Minor-ranking finals: 1 (1 title)

Non-ranking finals: 14 (6 titles)

Pro-am finals: 2

Team finals: 2 (1 title)

References

External links

Barry Hawkins at worldsnooker.com

Profile at Global Snooker

English snooker players
1979 births
Living people
Sportspeople from Dartford
People from Ditton, Kent